Cameron Sangster (born 29 December 1999) is an English former professional footballer who played as a midfielder, making two professional appearances for Plymouth Argyle.

Career
Cameron Sangster made his professional debut in a 4–1 win vs Oldham Athletic on 23 December 2017. Sangster replaced fellow midfielder David Fox, a player who was at the time twice his age, in the 89th minute of the EFL League One game. Sangster was the second apprentice to make a first team appearance for Argyle that season, following Michael Cooper's appearance vs Blackburn Rovers
in October 2017.

On 30 August 2019 Sangster, alongside fellow midfielder Tom Purrington, joined Dorchester Town of the Southern League Premier South on loan until January 2020.

On 1 November 2019, Sangster left Argyle by mutual consent, cancelling his loan at Dorchester in the process. His contract at Argyle was due to run until June 2020, but was cancelled by Sangster so he could focus on his business interests.

References

1999 births
Living people
Association football goalkeepers
English footballers
Plymouth Argyle F.C. players
English Football League players